Polar Record Glacier is a large glacier flowing between Meknattane Nunataks and Dodd Island to the central part of Publications Ice Shelf. Delineated in 1952 by John H. Roscoe from aerial photographs taken by U.S. Navy Operation Highjump, 1946–47. Named by Roscoe after Research Institute, Cambridge, England.

See also
 List of glaciers in the Antarctic
 Glaciology

References
 

Glaciers of Ingrid Christensen Coast